The Van Meter Community School District is a rural public school district headquartered in Van Meter, Iowa.

The district spans northern Madison County and southern Dallas County. The district serves Van Meter and the surrounding rural areas.

Schools
The district has three schools in a single facility Van Meter.
Van Meter Elementary School
Van Meter Middle School
Van Meter High School

Van Meter High School

Athletics
The Bulldogs compete in the West Central Activities Conference in the following sports:
Cross Country
Volleyball
Football
2017 Class 1A State Champions 
Basketball
Wrestling
Track and Field
Golf 
 Girls' 2018 Class 2A State Champions
Baseball
 4-time State Champions (1946, 2003, 2019, 2020) 
Softball
 2016 Class 2A State Champions

Enrollment

See also
List of school districts in Iowa
List of high schools in Iowa

References

External links
 Van Meter Community School District

School districts in Iowa
Education in Madison County, Iowa
Education in Dallas County, Iowa